Elsa Gramcko (1925–1994) was a Venezuelan artist, known as an abstract sculptor and painter. Her earlier works, which date from 1954, were geometric paintings, while her later works were more tachist in nature. While her earlier works consisted of mostly paintings, she expanded into sculpture and assemblage in the 1960s and 1970s.

History 
Elsa Gramcko was born 9 April 1925 in Puerto Cabello, Carabobo, Venezuela. Ida Gramcko, her sister, was an essayist and poet.

In 1959, José Gómez Sicre curated her first solo show at the Art Museum of the Americas in Washington D.C. She represented Venezuela in the 1959 São Paulo Art Biennial and in the 1964 Venice Biennale. In 1968 she was awarded the National Art Prize at the Official Salon of Venezuelan Art and in 1966 she became the first woman to obtain the first prize at the D'Empaire Salon held in Maracaibo, Zulia State, Venezuela. Her work is held in various private and public collections throughout Latin America and worldwide, including Museum of Modern Art (MOMA) and Spencer Museum of Art at the University of Kansas.

She died in 1994, in Caracas, Venezuela.

References

Further reading 
 Birbragher, Francine, et al. Embracing Modernity: Venezuelan geometric abstraction. Miami: The Frost Art Museum, 2010. 
 Farias, Luis Felipe, et al. "En Elsa Gramcko, la forma singular es la infinita", Diario El Nacional, 7 de Marzo, 2004, Page B-6, Caracas, Venezuela.
 Schön, Elizabeth, et al. Elsa Gramcko, una alquimista de nuestro tiempo: muestra antológica, 1957-1978. Caracas: Galería de Arte Nacional, 1997.

External links 
Elsa Gramcko (with examples of work) on Artnet.com
 Information on 2006 exhibit of work by Gramcko at the National Gallery of Venezuela (in Spanish)

Venezuelan painters
Venezuelan women sculptors
Venezuelan women painters
People from Puerto Cabello
1925 births
1994 deaths
20th-century Venezuelan sculptors
20th-century women artists